The Index of Industrial Production (IIP) is an index for India which details out the growth of various sectors in an economy such as mineral mining, electricity and manufacturing. The all India IIP is a composite indicator that measures the short-term changes in the volume of production of a basket of industrial products during a given period with respect to that in a chosen base period. It is compiled and published monthly by the Central Statistical Office (CSO), Ministry of Statistics and Programme Implementation six weeks after the reference month ends.

The level of the Index of Industrial Production (IIP) is an abstract number, the magnitude of which represents the status of production in the industrial sector for a given period of time as compared to a reference period of time. The base year was at one time fixed at 1993–94 so that year was assigned an index level of 100. The current base year is 2011-2012.

The Eight Core Industries comprise nearly 40.27% of the weight of items included in the Index of Industrial Production (IIP). These are Electricity , steel, refinery products, crude oil, coal, cement, natural gas and fertilisers.

The beginning
The first official attempt to compute the IIP was made much earlier than even the recommendations on the subject at the international level. The Office of the Economic Advisor, Ministry of Commerce and Industry made the first attempt of compilation and release of IIP with base year 1937, covering 15 important industries, accounting for more than 90 percent of the total production of the selected industries. The all-India IIP is being released as a monthly series since 1950. With the inception of the Central Statistical Organization in 1951, the responsibility for compilation and publication of IIP was vested with this office.

Successive revisions

As the structure of the industrial sector changes over time, it became necessary to revise the base year of the IIP periodically to capture the changing composition of industrial production and emergence of new products and services so as to measure the real growth of industrial sector (UNSO recommends quinquennial revision of the base year of IIP). After 1937, the successive revised base years were 1946, 1951, 1956, 1960, 1970, 1980–81 and 1993–94. Initially it was covering 15 industries comprising three broad categories: mining, manufacturing and electricity. The scope of the index was restricted to mining and manufacturing sectors consisting of 20 industries with 35 items, when the base year was shifted to 1946 by Economic Adviser, Ministry of Commerce & Industry and it was called Interim Index of Industrial Production. This index was discontinued in April 1956 due to certain shortcomings and was replaced by the revised index with 1951 as the base year covering 88 items, broadly categorised as mining & quarrying (2), manufacturing (17) and electricity (1) compiled by CSO. The items in this index were classified according to the International Standard Industrial Classification (ISIC) 1948 of all economic activities.

The index was revised in July 1962 to the base year 1956 as per the recommendations of a working group constituted by the CSO for the purpose and it had covered 201 items, classified according to the Standard Industrial and Occupational Classification of All Economic Activities published by the CSO in 1962. The index with 1960 as the base year was based on regular monthly series for 312 items and annual series for 436 items. Hence, though the published index was based on regular monthly series for 312 items, weights had been assigned for 436 items with a view to using the same set of weights for the regular monthly index as well as the annual index covering the additional items. However, the mineral index prepared by the IBM excluded gold, salt, petroleum and natural gas.

The next revised series of index numbers with 1970 as the base year, had taken into account of the structural changes occurred in industrial activity of the country since 1960 and this index was released in March 1975 covering 352 items comprising mining (61), manufacturing (290) and electricity (1). The working group (set up in 1978) under the Chairmanship of the then Director General of CSO, decided to shift the base to 1980–81, to reflect the changes that had taken place in the industrial structure and to accommodate the items from small-scale sector.

A notable feature of the revised 1980 index number series was the inclusion of 18 items from the SSI sector, for which the office of the Development Commissioner of Small-Scale Industries (DCSSI) could ensure regular supply of data. The production data for the small-scale sector were included only from the month of July 1984 onwards; prior to this the production data from the directorate general of technical development (DGTD) for large and medium industries alone had been used. For the period April 1981 to June 1984 in respect of these 18 items, average base year (1980–81) production as obtained from DGTD was used. From July 1984 onwards, combined average base year production both for DGTD and DCSSI products was used. The weights for these items were based on ASI 1980–1981 results and no separate weights for DGTD and DCSSI items were allocated in the 1980–81 series.

The next revision of IIP with 1993–94 as the base year containing 543 items (with the addition of 3 items for mining sector and 188 for the manufacturing sector) has come into existence on 27 May 1998 and ever since, the quick estimates of IIP are being released as per the norms set out for the IMF’s SDDS2, with a time lag of six weeks from the reference month. These quick estimates for a given month are revised twice in the subsequent months. To retain the distinctive character and enable the collection of data, the source agencies proposed clubbing of 478 items of the manufacturing sector into 285 item groups and thus making a total of 287 item groups together with one each of electricity and mining & quarrying. The revised series has followed the National Industrial Classification NIC-1987. Another important feature of the latest series is the inclusion of unorganised manufacturing sector (That is, the same 18 SSI products) along with organised sector for the first time in the weighting diagram.

Recent revision of IIP released by CSO with 2004–05 as the base year comprises 682 items. As per chief statistician T C A Anant, this index shall give a better picture of growth in various sectors of the economy, because it is broader and includes technologically advanced goods such as cell phones and iPods. The previous base year (1993–94) was not usable as the list contained an array of outdated items such as typewriters and tape recorders.

Weighted arithmetic mean of quantity relatives with weights being allotted to various items in proportion to value added by manufacture in the base year by using Laspeyres' formula:

See also
 Industrial production index

References

 https://web.archive.org/web/20120422084503/http://mospi.nic.in/mospi_new/upload/iip/IIP_main.htm?status=1&menu_id=89
 https://web.archive.org/web/20111113205916/http://www.mospi.nic.in/mospi_new/upload/t2_new.pdf

Economic data
Industry in India